Ludvig Engsund (born March 16, 1993) is a Swedish ice hockey goaltender. He is currently playing with Rögle BK of the Swedish Swedish Hockey League.

References

External links

1993 births
Living people
Swedish ice hockey goaltenders
Rögle BK players
Ice hockey people from Gothenburg